Onex or OneX or variation may mean:

Onex, Switzerland, a city in the canton of Geneva
Onex Corporation, a Canadian investment firm
Sonex Aircraft Onex, a homebuilt aircraft undergoing development
Xbox One X
HTC One X smartphone
One-X, a 2006 album by Three Days Grace

See also
 1X (disambiguation)